Sankrail Anil Biswas Smriti Mahavidyalaya, also known as Kultikri College, established in 2007, is a college in Kultikri, in the Jhargram district. It offers undergraduate courses in arts. It is affiliated to Vidyasagar University.

History 
Sankrail Anil Biswas Smriti Mahavidyalaya, established in 2007 and affiliated to Vidyasagar University is the outcome of genuine and sincere effort of the people of all spheres of Sankrail and neighbouring Blocks. The College has been named in the memory of Anil Biswas. In the last few years there has been a tremendous development in this area like any other part of West Bengal. Many Demands of the people of this area have been fulfilled. In spite of this the people feel a long left want, an institution for higher education for their younger generation. The area is inhabited by many poor backword class people including S.C.,S.T., and the minority community who cannot afford even the minimum expanses for the higher education of their wards, keeping them in hostels or boarding, away from their home.

As there was no institute for higher Education in these blocks (Sankrail, paschim Medinipur) and the neighbouring Blocks, such as Keshiary, Narayangarh, Gopiballavpur-II, some local social workers and enthusiasts for education formed an NGO Sankrail Block Education and Rural Development Society-a philanthropic Society which had been registered in the year 2003. The governing body of the society formed an organizing committee for the proposed college by the time, which did the usual preliminaries to start an Under graduate general degree College.

Departments 

This College offers B.A.(Hons.) & B.A.(General) Courses in below subjects

Arts
Bengali
English
Sanskrit
History
Political Science
Geography
Santali
Physical Education
Mathematics
Education
Philosophy

Accreditation
The college is recognized by the University Grants Commission (UGC).

See also

References

External links
Sankrail Anil Biswas Smriti Mahavidyalaya

Universities and colleges in Jhargram district
Colleges affiliated to Vidyasagar University
Educational institutions established in 2007
2007 establishments in West Bengal